Songs for Daddy is a 2014 Jill Johnson studio album. The album is a tribute to her father's music taste.

Track listing
Crazy in Love
Hallelujah I Love Him So
Fly Me to the Moon
Moon River
Something's Gotta Give
That's Life
Love is Here to Stay
The Very thought of You
No other Daddy but You
After You've Gone
Everybody Loves Somebody
I Can't Give You Anything but Love

Charts

Weekly charts

Year-end charts

References

2014 albums
Jill Johnson albums